Euxoa bogdanovi is a moth of the family Noctuidae described by Nikolay Grigoryevich Erschoff in 1873. It is found in the Siberian and Mongolian steppes as well as Turkestan, where it was first discovered.

External links
Lärchenwälder und kräuterreiche Wiesensteppen der lichten Taiga-Zone in der nördlichen Mongolei

Euxoa
Moths described in 1873